Orestiada railway station, is a railway station that serves the town of Orestiada, in Evros, in Eastern Macedonia and Thrace, Greece. Located  from the centre of Orestiada, on the eastern edge of the town. The station was open by OSE in 1996, at a cost of €4.5 million. Today TrainOSE operates just 4 daily Regional trains to Alexandroupoli. The station is unstaffed however there are waiting rooms available.

History
The station was built the mid-1990s to replace an older station (built in 1928) and was officially inaugurated on 16 September 1996. At the time, the line saw a large amount of commercial and passenger traffic and was the fourth busiest and third largest station in Northern Greece. In 2009, with the Greek debt crisis unfolding OSE's Management was forced to reduce services across the network. Timetables were cut back, and routes closed as the government-run entity attempted to reduce overheads. Services from Orestiada to Alexandroupoli were cut back to three trains a day, reducing the reliability of services and passenger numbers. With passenger footfall in sharp decline, the station building was closed and mothballed less than 15 years after it first opened. On 11 February 2011, all cross-border routes were closed and international services (to Istanbul, Sofia, etc.) were ended.

With usage down, the station suffered repeated attacks from vandalism, with the station clock and the Greek flag stolen, and the walls covered in graffiti. The canopies became shelters for immigrants entering from Turkey, the overpass filled syringes, even some broken windows and benches. However, the main building was left secured.
In 2014, the station building was refurbished and reopened after being closed for 3 years.

Facilities
Now the station is unstaffed and the waiting rooms are closed. The entrance is equipped with wheelchair ramps and parking in the forecourt.

Services
, the station is only served by one daily pair of regional trains, Alexandroupoli–Ormenio.

References

Railway stations in Eastern Macedonia and Thrace
Railway stations opened in 1996
Buildings and structures in Evros (regional unit)
Orestiada